Rhene kenyaensis is a jumping spider species in the genus Rhene that lives in Kenya. The male was first described in 2014.

References

Endemic fauna of Kenya
Salticidae
Spiders described in 2014
Spiders of Africa
Fauna of Kenya
Taxa named by Wanda Wesołowska